Stuart James Legg (born 27 September 1975) is an English former rugby union footballer who played 54 games for Newcastle Falcons.

Early life

Legg learned his rugby at Solihull School. He matriculated at Durham University in 1994 and represented the university rugby team, where he was a teammate of Will Greenwood.

Career

After university Legg turned professional with Newcastle, making his debut against Bath Rugby in the first match of the season, where he played 54 minutes and scored a try. He soon became the first choice fullback, reducing the more experienced Tim Stimpson to the bench and ultimately the transfer list. He made 21 appearances during the 1997-98 season, which saw his team win the league for the first time - having been promoted from National Division 2 the year before.

By the 1999-2000 season Legg found opportunities were more limited and he made only 10 starts. He then signed for Biarritz, where he won the Championship title during the 2001-2002 season. The following season he joined Treviso, playing another four years before retiring from rugby.

References

1975 births
Living people
English rugby union players
Newcastle Falcons players
Durham University RFC players
People educated at Solihull School
Alumni of Hatfield College, Durham
Rugby union players from Solihull
Rugby union fullbacks